Year 1269 (MCCLXIX) was a common year starting on Tuesday (link will display the full calendar) of the Julian calendar.

Events 

 By place 

 Europe 
 June 16 – Battle of Colle Val d'Elsa: Guelph forces (2,200 men) led by King Charles I defeat the Ghibellines at Tuscany. After the battle, the Guelphs drive out their adversaries at Colle di Val d'Elsa, destroying their houses, and confiscating their possessions.
 June 19 – King Louis IX (the Saint) orders all Jews found in public, without an identifying yellow badge, to be fined ten livres of silver. He also confiscates goods from the Jewish population to fund the Eighth Crusade.
 September – An Aragonese contingent under King James I (the Conqueror) sails from Barcelona to the Holy Land but is caught in a storm and badly damaged. One squadron reaches Acre, but later returns to Aragon.
 King Ottokar II inherits Carinthia and part of Carniola, making him the most powerful German prince within the Holy Roman Empire; the empire lacking an emperor during the ongoing “Great Interregnum”.

 England 
 Prince Edward (the Lord Edward) obtains the right to levy a twentieth of the value of the Church's wealth to finance the Ninth Crusade. That sum turns out to be insufficient, and Edward has to borrow to reach his target.
 John Comyn begins the construction of Blair Castle, in Scotland.

 Africa 
 September 8 – Berber forces of the Marinid Sultanate under Abu Yusuf Yaqub complete the conquest of Morocco and capture Marrakesh after a long siege, effectively ending the Almohad Caliphate. The last Almohad ruler, Idris al-Wathiq (or Abu Dabbus), is assassinated by a slave. The Marinids become the new masters of the Western Maghreb, Abu Yusuf Yaqub takes up the title of "Prince of the Muslims".

 By topic 

 Religion 
 March – Ode de Pougy, French Abbess of Notre Dame aux Nonnains, and several associates who assist her are excommunicated.
 Opizzo Fieschi, Latin patriarch of Antioch, is exiled. Being displaced because of the East–West Schism of 1054 (approximate date).

 Science 
 Pierre de Maricourt, French mathematician and writer, performs a series of experiments with magnetic poles and proposes that a machine can be run forever in perpetual motion using the properties of magnets.

Births 
 June 18 – Eleanor of England, English princess  (d. 1298)
 July 10 – Duan Zong (or Zhao Shi), Chinese emperor (d. 1278)
 Alexander of San Elpidio, Italian friar and bishop (d. 1326)
 Frederick Tuta, German nobleman and regent (d. 1291) 
 Huang Gongwang (or Lu Jian), Chinese painter (d. 1354)
 Louis III, German nobleman, knight and regent (d. 1296)
 Nichizō, Japanese Buddhist monk and disciple (d. 1342)
 Philip of Artois, French nobleman and knight (d. 1298)

Deaths 
 July 7 – Saionji Saneuji, Japanese poet and writer (b. 1194)
 October 1 – Giordano Pironti, Italian aristocrat and cardinal 
 October 27 – Ulrich III, German nobleman and knight (b. 1220)
 Abu al-Hasan al-Shushtari, Moorish poet and writer (b. 1212)
 Albin of Brechin (or Albinus), Scottish prelate and bishop
 Baba Hyder Vali of Mulbagal, Persian disciple and mystic
 Constance of Aaragon, Spanish princess (infanta) (b. 1239)
 Ebulo de Montibus, Savoyan nobleman and knight (b. 1230)
 Geoffrey of Sergines, French nobleman and knight (b. 1205)
 Gregorio di Montelongo, Italian bishop of Tripoli (b. 1200)
 Guigues VII, French ruler (dauphin) of Viennois (b. 1225)
 Idris al-Wathiq (or Abu Dabbus), Almohad ruler (caliph) 
 John Lestrange, English landowner and knight (b. 1194)
 Liu Kezhuang, Chinese poet and literary critic (b. 1187)
 Oberto Pallavicino, Italian nobleman (signore) (b. 1197)
 Vasilko Romanovich, Grand Prince of Kiev (b. 1203)
 William III de Beauchamp, English nobleman (b. 1215)

References